The Bernhard Blumenfeld was a  cargo ship that was completed in 1921 as the SS Dalewood by Eltringham's, Ltd., Willington on Tyne, England. She was sold to a German company in 1923 and renamed the Bernhard Blumenfeld. She was sold again in 1938 and renamed the Carl Jüngst.

This ship was seized by the British Army in the port of Kiel, Germany, in May 1945 and given to the Ministry of War Transport which renamed her the Empire Durant. In 1946, she was donated to the Soviet Union and there renamed the Tambov. She was deleted from the Soviet shipping registries in 1958.

Description
This ship was built in 1921 by Eltringham's, Ltd., Willington on Tyne, England.

Her DWT was 4,450.

The engine was built by Eltringham's.

History
Dalewood was built in 1921 for W France, Fenwick & Co, Ltd., London. She was completed in August. The United Kingdom Official Number 146080 was allocated. In 1923, she was sold to the B. Blumenfeld Kommandit Gesellschaft auf Aktien, Hamburg and renamed Bernhard Blumenfeld. The Code Letters RDSN were allocated and her port of registry was Hamburg. With the change of Code Letters in 1934, she was allocated DHCG.

In 1938, the Bernhard Blumenfeld was sold to the Krupp Reederei und Kohlenhandel GmbH, Essen and renamed the Carl Jüngst. Her Code Letters and port of registry remained unchanged. In May 1945, the Carl Jüngst was seized by the British Army at Kiel, Germany. Declared a war prize, she was passed to the MoWT and renamed the SS Empire Durant. She regained her Official Number 146080 and was allocated the Code Letters GMQJ. In 1946, the Empire Durant was donated to the Soviet Union. She was renamed the Tambov, serving as the mother ship for Soviet fishing fleets. In May 1950, the Tambov, along with 30 trawlers, called at Mount's Bay, Cornwall, for refueling. This fleet was on a voyage from the Baltic Sea to the Black Sea, where they were to fish for sprats. Tambov was deleted from shipping registers in 1958.

References

1921 ships
Ships built on the River Tyne
Steamships of the United Kingdom
Merchant ships of the United Kingdom
Steamships of Germany
Merchant ships of Germany
World War II merchant ships of Germany
Empire ships
Ministry of War Transport ships
Steamships of the Soviet Union
Merchant ships of the Soviet Union